AEK Basketball Club (Αθλητική Ένωσις Κωνσταντινουπόλεως Athlitikí Énosis Konstantinoupóleos, "Athletic Union of Constantinople"), also known as AEK B.C. or AEK, and more commonly known in European competitions as AEK Athens, is a Greek professional basketball club based in Athens, Greece, part of the major multi-sport club AEK. The club was established in Athens in 1924 by Greek refugees from Constantinople in the wake of the Greco-Turkish War (1919–1922).

AEK is one of the three most popular and successful teams in Greece (including Panathinaikos and Olympiacos) especially in European achievements, with millions of fans in both Greece and Cyprus
as well as in the Greek communities all over the world, mainly in Australia, United Kingdom and North America.

AEK was the first-ever Greek basketball team, not only to reach a European Cup Final, but also to win a European title. On 4 April 1968, AEK defeated Slavia VŠ Praha by a score of 89–82, in Athens in front of 80,000 fans. They have won the Greek League 8 times (1957–58, 1962–63, 1963–64, 1964–65, 1965–66, 1967–68, 1969–70, 2001–02), and the Greek Cup 5 times (1980–81, 1999–00, 2000–01, 2017–18, 2019–20), while they have also twice won the FIBA Saporta Cup (former European Cup Winners' Cup) (1967–68 and 1999–00). AEK won the Champions League on 6 May 2018, defeating Monaco by a score of 100–94 and the FIBA Intercontinental Cup on 17 February 2019, defeating Flamengo by a score of 86–70. Well-known players that have played with the club over the years have included: Rolando Blackman, Ricky Pierce, Danny Vranes, Ruben Patterson, Kurt Rambis, J.R. Holden, Willie Anderson, Joe Arlauckas, Anthony Bowie, Arijan Komazec, Martin Müürsepp, Josh Owens, Clint Richardson, Bill Edwards, Victor Alexander, Claudio Coldebella, İbrahim Kutluay, Pero Antić, Carl English, Pops Mensah-Bonsu, Bane Prelević, Georgios Amerikanos, Georgios Trontzos, Vassilis Goumas, Minas Gekos, Pavlos Stamelos, Kostas Patavoukas, Angelos Koronios, Michalis Kakiouzis, Nikos Chatzis, Jake Tsakalidis, Nikos Zisis, Nasos Galakteros, Vassilis Lanes, Dimos Dikoudis, Dimitris Papanikolaou, Ioannis Bourousis, Mario Chalmers, Jonas Mačiulis and Keith Langford

AEK B.C. has been named as the best Greek team in all sports, at either the sports club or national team level, in 1965, 1966, and 1968, by SJA of Greece (the Sports Journalists' Association of Greece).

History

Early years

The large Greek population of Constantinople, not unlike those of the other Ottoman urban centres, continued its athletic traditions in the form of numerous athletic clubs. Clubs such as Enosis Tataoulon, from the Tatavla district, Megas Alexandros, Hermes of Galata, Olympias of Therapia, and Kati Kioi of Chalcedon, existed to promote Hellenic athletic and cultural ideals. These were amongst a dozen Greek-backed clubs that dominated the sporting landscape of the city in the years preceding World War I. After the war, with the influx of mainly French and English soldiers to Constantinople, many of the city clubs participated in regular competitions, with teams formed by foreign troops. Taxim, Pera, and Tatavla became the scene of weekly competitions in not only football, but of athletics, cycling, boxing, and tennis.

Of the clubs in the city though, football was dominated by Enosis Tataoulon and Hermes. Hermes, one of the more popular clubs, was formed in 1875, by the Greek community of Pera (Galata). Forced by the Kemalist regime to change its name to Pera Club in 1923, many of its athletes fled to Greece, and settled in Athens and Thessaloniki. The basketball team of AEK is actually the most successful among AEK's athletic departments. The obvious reason is the successes in general of Greek basketball, and that AEK's basketball team was the first ever Greek team to win an international trophy, in any team sport. Under Kostas Karamanlis' guidance, AEK won the club's first Greek League championship in 1958.

1924–1957
Kostas Dimopoulos, one of the creators of the AEK athletic club and footballer of the early years, had the idea of also creating a basketball team. His efforts quickly were matched by others who loved the sport of basketball. He then took over the leadership of the club's basketball department, and together with the Simeonidi brothers, Eumenes Athanasiadis and others, created the club's first basketball team. In the beginning, they took part in friendly games, where they made a good impression. After that, AEK won the first regional basketball championship that was played in Athens, which was organized by the local YMCA, in 1924.

In 1928, AEK took part in the first Greek basketball championship, in the Athens-Piraeus 1927–28 regional championship. In 1929, the Greek basketball championship was not held, and AEK did not play in any league. In 1930, the basketball section was not declared in any organized competition, with the effective efforts of Kostas Dimopoulos and his associates to do so, failing. The club's basketball section then remained in obscurity for many years. However, in 1949, it reappeared, and the club's administration of that time created a new and competitive team. In the 1952–53 season, AEK played in the Greek basketball championship for the first time since 1928. In the 1954–55 Greek League championship AEK had an impressive run, however, they finished behind Panellinios.

1957–1959
In 1958, AEK B.C., led by the player-coach Kostas Karamanlis, won their first Greek League championship, after defeating Panellinios in the final, by a score of 67–54.

The club also founded a women's section at this time, which lasted for a short time. The department had success with the four sisters Chorianopoulou sisters. However, the club did not give the necessary importance to the department, and it was later dissolved.

Amerikanos' era (1960–1970): 6 Championships and a European title

"The Union", in the early 1960s, won the Athens-Piraeus Regional Championship two times in a row (1960, 1961), but did not manage to become the national league champion of Greece. But the 1960s decade was to be the most important in the history of AEK's basketball club. The team's head coach of the time, Missas Pantazopoulos, created a great roster and led the team to the top of Greece. The club's leading figure during these years was Georgios Amerikanos, who was nicknamed "Global".

In the 1962–63 season, AEK won the first of four consecutive Greek League championships. In the next season, AEK's leading scorer was Antonis Christeas (4th overall in the league), and the club was once again the Greek League champion. In the 1964–65 season, Georgios Amerikanos was the top scorer of the league, and AEK were once again the Greek League champions.

In the following 1965–66 season, AEK won its 4th consecutive Greek League championship, and also became the first Greek basketball team to play in the semi-finals of the FIBA Europe Champions Cup (now called the EuroLeague), as they played at the 1966 Final Four, which was held in Italy. These successes were accompanied by an unfortunate large loss for the team. As one of the team's players, Giorgos Moschos had contracted cancer, but he managed to participate in certain competitions that year, before he died on 29 December 1966, at age 29.

The next season, AEK lost the Greek League championship to Panathinaikos. However, a year later, under head coach Nikos Milas, AEK returned to the top of Greece, as they won the 1967–68 Greek League season championship, without losing a game. Georgios Amerikanos was again the Greek League's Top Scorer.

1968 European Cup Winners' Cup: first European title for a Greek club

AEK was the first ever Greek basketball team to participate in the FIBA European Champions Cup (now called the EuroLeague) Final Four, in 1966, which was held in Bologna, Italy. Two years later, AEK was the first-ever Greek team, not only to reach a FIBA European Cup Winners' Cup Final, but also to win a European-wide title.  On April 4, 1968, AEK defeated Slavia VŠ Praha, by a score of 89–82, in Athens, in front of 80,000 spectators (at the time, the Guinness world record in basketball attendance) in Kallimarmaron Stadium. In 1970, AEK reached the FIBA European Cup Winners' Cup semi-finals, where the team was eliminated by JA Vichy, France, in what turned out to be the last year of the first "Golden Era" of the club's history.  It was called the "Golden Era" because AEK dominated Greek basketball during the 1960s, winning the Greek League championship 4 consecutive years, in 1963, 1964, 1965, and 1966, as well as in 1968 and 1970; for a total of 6 titles in 8 years.

Although there are no official records with regards to the Greek Cup before 1975, according to some sources, AEK won the Greek Cup in the years of 1967 and 1971.

1970–1990
Over the next decades, AEK lost its prestige and managed to win only one trophy, the Greek Cup in 1981, under the direction of Coach Fred Develey, an American coach who previously was the head coach of Maccabi Tel Aviv and Aris of Greece, with superstar Nick Galis. In addition to winning the Greek Cup in 1981, AEK was also a finalist in the Greek Cup in 1976, 1978, 1980, 1988, and 1992, but failed to win in any of those years.

The Queen's comeback

AEK made a comeback in the late 1990s, when the team played in six consecutive Greek Cup Final Fours in the years 1996, 1997, 1998, 1999, 2000, 2001, four consecutive Greek Cup Finals in the years 1998, 1999, 2000, 2001, winning the Greek Cup in 2000 and 2001. In 2002, AEK won the Greek League championship for the first time in 32 years, becoming the first team to win the Greek League championship after having lost the first two games of a 5-game playoff series. AEK lost the first two games of the series to Olympiacos, but managed to win the next 3 games, and take the series and the title 3–2. AEK also reached the Greek Playoff Finals in the years 1997, 2003, and 2005, and the Greek Cup Semi-finals in the year 2006.

1998 ΕuroLeague runners-up and 2000 Saporta Cup winners
In this same era, AEK again reached a high level in European-wide competitions. The team reached the FIBA EuroLeague's Final Four in Barcelona in 1998, and beat Benetton Treviso, by a score of 69–66, before losing in the EuroLeague Final to Kinder Bologna, by a score of 58–44. In 2000, on 11 April, AEK won their second international trophy, the FIBA Saporta Cup, by defeating Kinder Bologna 83–76. The next year, 2001, AEK reached the EuroLeague semi-finals, where they lost their playoff series against Tau Cerámica, in 3 straight games. AEK had success in the EuroLeague in the 2002 season, reaching the Top 16 phase, but the 2003 and 2004 seasons were disasters in the EuroLeague. In 2005, AEK once again shined and reached the Top 16, but a few losses prevented the team from reaching the EuroLeague playoffs.

Relegation, dissolution and fresh start
After the 2005–06 season, the owner of the club and major shareholder cut off the club's funding, and various management schemes each year assumed the financial obligations of the club. 
As a result, the roster gradually weakened year after year, the group declined each year to lower-level league positions and had even less success in European competitions, and the club's debts
that were accrued were impossible to pay. In April 2011, AEK was relegated down to the Greek Second Division (A2) due to serious financial
problems and there was a great danger for its participation in the next championships.

A new administration council, with Nikos Georgantzoglou as a president, defined by the Athens Court on 12 September 2011 so that the club could be saved and play in the A2 division.
AEK had a record of 20 wins and 10 losses during the 2011–12 Greek A2 Basket League season.
In the summer of 2012, AEK's board of directors announced its participation in the Greek 3rd national category Greek B League ("B Ethniki") "Southern Group",
for the 2012–13 season, as an amateur club. The team had a record of 22 wins and 3 losses and was promoted to the A2 category.
In the 2013–14 season, AEK once again played in the Greek Second Division. Finally, AEK was the winner of the second division championship and won the league promotion to be able to play in the 
top Greek League again, after a 3-year period of absence. AEK had a record of 23 wins and 3 losses during the Greek A2 Basket League 2013–14 season.

In September 2014, AEK overcame heavy financial problems, after Makis Angelopoulos bought the majority stake of the club's shares, just to return to the Greek elite level, and thus wanted to showcase its tradition and ambition in Greece and Europe. In the 2014–15 season, AEK finished in fifth place in the top-tier level Greek League, with 15 wins and 11 losses.

Return to European cup competitions
In the 2015–16 season, AEK returned to the European-wide 2nd-tier level EuroCup, for the first time since the 2006–07 season. AEK returned to the EuroCup, after having come off a return-to-form season, in which it finished fifth overall in the first-tier level Greek League, to reach the Greek League playoffs, after a seven-year absence. AEK then joined the newly formed FIBA Champions League, for the 2016–17 season. The team reached the 2016–17 FIBA Champions League Round 16.

2018 Greek Cup winners
On 17 February 2018, AEK won the 2018 Greek Cup Final against Olympiacos, by a score of 88–83, at Heraklion Indoor Sports Arena, on the island of Crete. It was AEK's first top-tier title won since they won the 2001–02 Greek Basket League season's championship.

2018 FIBA Champions League and 2019 FIBA Intercontinental cup winners

On 6 May 2018, AEK won the 2018 FIBA Champions League final against the French club AS Monaco by a score of 100–94 in the Nikos Galis Olympic Indoor Hall of Athens. By winning the FIBA Champions League trophy, AEK earned the right to add a third star to its club crest. The team also qualified to participate in the next edition of the FIBA Intercontinental Cup tournament. In the following FIBA Champions League competition AEK was knocked out of the competition in the quarter-finals by the German side Brose Bamberg. Nevertheless, a bit earlier in the 2018–19 season, AEK became the global basketball champions, for the first time in their perennial history, by winning the 2019 FIBA Intercontinental Cup final against the Brazilian club Flamengo by a score of 86–70 in the Carioca Arena 1 of Rio de Janeiro. That marked the third FIBA Intercontinental Cup championship that was won by a Greek club, after Panathinaikos had won the 1996 FIBA Intercontinental Cup, and Olympiacos had won the 2013 FIBA Intercontinental Cup.

2020 Greek Cup winners and 2020 FIBA Champions League runners-up
On 16 February 2020, AEK won the 2020 Greek Cup final against Promitheas Patras, by a score of 61–57, at Heraklion Indoor Sports Arena, on the island of Crete. It was AEK's second national top-tier title in two years. On 4 October 2020, AEK lost by 85–74 from the Spanish side San Pablo Burgos in the 2019–20 FIBA Champions League final that was held in the Nikos Galis Olympic Indoor Hall of Athens. This was the second FIBA Champions League final in three years for AEK Athens. The team also holds the FIBA Champions League highest attendance record, as 17,984 fans attended the 2017–18 FIBA Champions League final in the Nikos Galis Olympic Indoor Hall.

Crest, colours, supporters

In 1924, AEK adopted as their emblem, the image of a double-headed eagle. When AEK was created by Greek refugees from Constantinople, in the years following the Greco-Turkish War, and subsequent population exchange, the emblem and colours (yellow and black) were chosen as a reminder of lost homelands; they represent the club's historical ties to Constantinople. After all, the double-headed eagle is featured in the flag of the Greek Orthodox Church, whose headquarters are in Constantinople, and served as the Imperial emblem under the Palaiologos dynasty. The emblem of the department of AEK basketball has evolved over time. From 1924 to 2015, the emblem of the department was similar to that of the football club. Since 2015, AEK B.C. has created a new version of the emblem, by adding to it two stars at its center, which symbolize the club's 2 FIBA Saporta Cup European-wide titles.

The colours of yellow/gold, black and Imperial purple were adopted from AEK's connections with Constantinople and the Byzantine Empire.

Kit manufacturers and Shirt sponsors

 Current sponsorships: nrg, AVIS, Cosmote, Betsson

Supporters
AEK has a large fan base all over Greece. The majority of AEK supporters are refugees or have refugee descent from Constantinople, and people from the population exchange of the Minor Asia Catastrophe. Original 21 is the largest supporters group. The first attempt to organize AEK supporters was Gate 21 (formed in 1975), which took its name from the gate in the Nikos Goumas Stadium at Nea Filadelfia, where the most hardcore fans of the club gathered. AEK also has many supporters worldwide, most of them being Greek immigrants, in places like North America, UK, Australia, and Cyprus.

Rivalries
The main rivalries of the AEK are the ones with Panathinaikos and Olympiacos. Against Panathinaikos, the rivalry started not only because of both competing for titles, but also because of the refugee ancestry of AEK fans, and by contrast, that Panathinaikos was considered to be the representative club of the old Athenian high class society. Against Olympiacos, the rivalry is mostly related to the football rivalry of the two clubs.

Arenas

Note: The capacities listed are the capacities of the arenas at the time AEK used them, and are not necessarily the same as the arena's current capacities. Also, the capacities only list the arena's all-seat seating capacity (if applicable), and not the arena's total capacities. In addition, in some cases, the listed capacities only reflect the number of seats currently made publicly available for use, and may not reflect the number of total seats actually in the arena.

Players

Retired numbers

Current roster

Depth chart

Squad changes for the 2022–23 season

In

Out

Honours and titles

Worldwide competitions
FIBA Intercontinental Cup
  Winners (1): 2019

European competitions

 Euroleague
  Runner-up (1): 1998
  Semi-finals (2): 1966, 2001
 FIBA Saporta Cup
  Winners (2): 1968, 2000
  Semi-finals (1): 1970
 FIBA Champions League
  Winners (1): 2018
  Runner-up (1): 2020

Domestic competitions
Greek League
  Winners (8): 1957–58, 1962–63, 1963–64, 1964–65, 1965–66, 1967–68, 1969–70, 2001–02
  Runner-up (9): 1954–55, 1966–67, 1968–69, 1970–71, 1973–74, 1996–97, 2002–03, 2004–05, 2019–20

 Greek Cup
  Winners (5): 1980–81, 1999–00, 2000–01, 2017–18, 2019–20
  Runner-up (7): 1975–76, 1977–78, 1979–80, 1987–88, 1991–92, 1997–98, 1998–99
 Greek A2 League
  Winners (1): 2013–14
  Runner-up (1): 2011–12 
 Attica State Championship
  Winners (4): 1924–25, 1927–28, 1959–60, 1960–61
 Attica State Cup
  Winners (2): 1966–67, 1970–71

Youth teams
 Greek League U18
 Winners (1): 2002–03
 Attica State Championship U21
 Winners (1): 2016–17
 Attica State Championship U18
 Winners (2): 2002–03, 2017–18
 Attica State Championship U18
 Winners (1): 1949–50
 Attica State Championship – 2nd Division U18
 Winners (1): 2015–16
 Attica State Championship – 2nd Division U16
 Winners (1): 2016–17

Individual team awards

 Continental Double (European league, Club world cup)
 Winners (1): 2017–18

Individual awards and records

FIBA Intercontinental Cup

FIBA Intercontinental Cup MVP
 Jordan Theodore – 2019

FIBA Intercontinental Cup Top Scorer
 Jordan Theodore – 2019

FIBA Saporta Cup

FIBA Saporta Cup Finals MVP
 Anthony Bowie – 1999–2000

FIBA European Cup Winners' Cup Final Top Scorer
 Georgios Amerikanos – 1967–68

Basketball Champions League

Basketball Champions League MVP
 Keith Langford – 2019–20
 Manny Harris – 2017–18

Basketball Champions League Final Four MVP
 Mike Green – 2017–18

Basketball Champions League Top Scorer
 Vince Hunter – 2018–19

Basketball Champions League Final Top Scorer
 Mike Green – 2017–18

Basketball Champions League First team
 Keith Langford – 2019–20
 Vince Hunter – 2018–19
 Manny Harris – 2017–18

Basketball Champions League Second team
 Dušan Šakota (2) – 2016–17, 2017–18

Basketball Champions League Efficiency per game leader
 Vince Hunter – 2018–19

Basketball Champions League 2-pointer scoring leader
 Vince Hunter – 2018–19

Basketball Champions League MVP of the Month
Yanick Moreira – November 2020

Basketball Champions League Game Day MVP
 Vince Hunter (3) – 2018–19 GD4, 2018–19 GD12, 2018–19 GD13
 Manny Harris (2) – 2017–18 GD14, 2017–18 R16
 Howard Sant-Roos – 2019–20 GD9
 Malcolm Griffin – 2018–19 GD8

Greek Basket League

Greek League MVP
 Dimos Dikoudis – 2001–02

Greek League Finals MVP
 Dimos Dikoudis – 2001–02

Greek League Best Defender
 Howard Sant-Roos – 2018–19

Greek League First team
 Loukas Mavrokefalidis – 2015–16
 Nikos Chatzis – 2003–04

Greek League Best Young Player
 Nikos Zisis – 2001–02
 Dimos Dikoudis – 1999–00

Greek League PIR leader
 Vince Hunter – 2018–19

Greek League Top scorer
 Georgios Amerikanos (2) – 1964–65, 1967–68
 Loukas Mavrokefalidis – 2015–16

Greek League Rebounds leader
 K'zell Wesson – 2007–08

Greek League Steals leader
 Vince Hunter – 2018–19

Greek League 3-pointer scoring leader
 Makis Nikolaidis (3) – 2006–07, 2009–10, 2010–11
 Carl English – 2014–15
 Nikos Chatzis – 2004–05

Greek League 2-pointer scoring leader
 Vince Hunter – 2018–19

Greek League Fouls Drawn leader
 Keith Langford – 2020–21

Greek League free throw scoring leader
 Keith Langford – 2019–20
 Taurean Green – 2009–10

Greek League free throw % made leader
 Mike Green – 2017–18
 Dušan Šakota – 2016–17

Greek League Turnovers leader
 Taurean Green – 2009–10

Greek Basketball Cup

Greek Cup Final MVP
 Nikos Zisis – 2019–20
 Manny Harris – 2017–18
 İbrahim Kutluay – 2000–01
 Kurt Rambis (Kyriakos Rambidis) – 1980–81

Greek Cup Final Top Scorer
 Kendrick Ray – 2019–20
 İbrahim Kutluay – 2000–01
 Vassilis Goumas – 1980–81

HEBA Greek All-Star Game

HEBA Greek All-Star
 Nikos Chatzis (6) – 1997-2000, 2004, 2005
 Dimos Dikoudis (4) – 2000-2003
 Jonas Mačiulis (2) – 2019, 2020
 Makis Nikolaidis (2) – 2010, 2011
 Charis Giannopoulos – 2020
 Marcus Slaughter – 2020
 Giannoulis Larentzakis – 2019
 Vassilis Kavvadas – 2018
 Dimitrios Papanikolaou – 2009
 Ioannis Bourousis – 2006
 Toby Bailey – 2005
 Sandro Nicević – 2005
 Nikos Zisis – 2005
 Andreas Glyniadakis – 2004
 Horace Jenkins – 2004
 Christos Tapoutos – 2004
 Andrew Betts – 2003
 Chris Carr – 2002
 Jon Robert Holden – 2002
 Michalis Kakiouzis – 2002
 İbrahim Kutluay – 2001
 Vrbica Stefanov – 2001
 Anthony Bowie – 2000
 Evangelos Koronios – 2000
 Willie Anderson – 1998
 Bill Edwards – 1997
 Dimitrios Podaras – 1994
 Nasos Galakteros – 1992
 Thomas Jordan – 1992
 Kostas Patavoukas – 1992

HEBA Greek All-Star Head Coach
 Giannis Ioannidis (2) – 1997, 1998
 Ilias Papatheodorou – 2020
 Luca Banchi – 2019
 Fotis Katsikaris – 2005
 Dragan Šakota – 2002
 Slobodan Subotić – 1996

HEBA Greek All-Star Game 3-Point Shootout Contest winner
 Nikos Chatzis (2) – 2000, 2003
 Dimitrios Podaras – 1994

HEBA Greek All-Star Game Slam Dunk Contest winner
 Toby Bailey – 2005

HEBA Greek Youth All-Star Game MVP
 Christos Tapoutos – 2003

Rising Stars versus All-Time Stars MVP
 Nikos Rogkavopoulos – 2020

Other

FIBA Hall of Fame
 Dušan Ivković

50 Greatest EuroLeague Contributors
 Dušan Ivković

EuroLeague Basketball Legend Award
 Dušan Ivković

EuroLeague Basketball 2000–10 All-Decade Team
 Jon Robert Holden

FIBA European Selection
 Georgios Trontzos (2) – 1965, 1967
 Christos Zoupas – 1966

FIBA Europe Young Men's Player of the Year Award
 Nikos Zisis – 2005

FIBA U20 European Championship MVP
 Nikos Zisis – 2002

FIBA U16 European Championship Division 2 MVP
 Nikos Rogkavopoulos – 2017

Performance in European and Worldwide competitions

The European and Worldwide Cup glory paths

Season-by-season

All competitions
Scroll down to see more.

Greek Basket League participation
AEK was one of three Greek teams that had always competed in the first tier Greek competition, until it first experienced relegation following the 2010–11 season, and thus did not play in the top-tier in the 2011–12 season. AEK's course in the tournaments is in the table below.
 Shift the bar to the right side to see all season results

Player records

Club top scorers and most appearances

Retired jerseys

One-club men

Personnel

Ownership and Current Board

Technical staff

Notable former players

Greece
  Georgios Amerikanos (1959–1975) 
  Ioannis Athinaiou (2014–2015) 
  Georgios Bogris (2021–2022) 
  Ioannis Bourousis (2001–2006) 
  Nikos Chatzis (1995–2005, 2007–2009) 
  Vangelis Dermanoutsos (1955–1967) 
  Dimos Dikoudis (1998–2003, 2010–2011) 
  Antonis Christeas (1962–1970)
  Vangelis Fotsis (1977–1988)
  Nasos Galakteros (1989–1993) 
  Minas Gekos (1976–1991, 1994–1995) 
  Charis Giannopoulos (2018–2020) 
  Michalis Giannouzakos (1974–1981) 
  Nikos Gkikas (2019–2021) 
  Andreas Glyniadakis (2003–2005, 2007) 
  Vassilis Goumas (1979–1985) 
  Michalis Kakiouzis (1995–2002) 
  Konstantinos Karamanlis (1951–1959) 
  Vassilis Kikilias (2000–2003) 
  Giannis Kalampokis (2005–2006, 2015–2016) 
  Akis Kallinikidis (2009–2011)
  Leonidas Kaselakis (2014–2015) 
  Dimitrios Katsivelis (2015–2016, 2020–2021) 
  Vassilis Kavvadas (2017–2019) 
  Apostolos Kontos (1983–1987) 
  Nestoras Kommatos (2006–2007) 
  Antonis Koniaris (2021–present) 
  Angelos Koronios (1998–2000) 
  Eas Larentzakis (1962–1972) 
  Giannoulis Larentzakis (2016–2019) 
  Dimitrios Mavroeidis (2015–2018, 2019–present) 
  Loukas Mavrokefalidis (2015–2016, 2017) 
  Georgios Moschos (1961–1966) 
  Nikos Nesiadis (1964–1976) 
  Makis Nikolaidis (1996–1999, 2006–2007, 2009–2011) 
  Dimitris Papadopoulos (1995–1999)
  Dimitris Papanikolaou (2007–2009) 
  Nikos Pappas (2021–present) 
  Kostas Patavoukas (1985–1993) 
  Michalis Pelekanos (2004–2006) 
  Michalis Polytarchou (2012–2015) 
  Nikos Rogkavopoulos (2017–2021) 
 - Dušan Šakota (2014–2019) 
  Thanasis Skourtopoulos (1982–1991) 
  Pavlos Stamelos (1979–1981) 
  Christos Tapoutos (2001–2004, 2006–2009) 
 - Jake Tsakalidis (1996–2000) 
  Georgios Trontzos (1963–1980) 
  Lakis Tsavas (1962–1969) 
  Kostas Vasileiadis (2016–2017) 
  Stelios Vasileiadis (1962–1975) 
  Panagiotis Vasilopoulos (2018) 
  Vassilis Xanthopoulos (2017–2019) 
  Nikos Zisis (2000–2005, 2020–2021) 
  Christos Zoupas (1962–1974) 

USA
  Victor Alexander (1997–1998) 
  Willie Anderson (1997–1998) 
  Joe Arlauckas (1998–1999) 
  William Avery (2007–2008) 
  Toby Bailey (2004–2005) 
 - Rolando Blackman (1994–1995) 
  Anthony Bowie (1999–2000) 
  Tony Campbell (1995) 
  Chris Carr (2001–2002) 
  Lionel Chalmers (2005–2006) 
  Mario Chalmers (2019–2020) 
  Joe Crispin (2003) 
  Dionte Christmas (2016) 
  Lloyd Daniels (1998–1999) 
  Bill Edwards (1996–1997) 
  Erick Green (2021–2022) 
  Mike Green (2017–2018) 
  Anthony Grundy (2010–2011) 
  Malik Hairston (2015–2016) 
  Jack Haley (1993) 
  Manny Harris (2017–2018, 2021) 
  Ian Hummer (2021–2022) 
  Vince Hunter (2018–2019) 
  Horace Jenkins (2003–2004) 
  Thomas Jordan (1990-1992) 
  Kannard Johnson (1993) 
  Keith Langford (2019–2021, 2022) 
  Marcus Liberty (1995–1996) 
  Daryl Macon (2021) 
  Carlton McKinney (1992) 
  Dan O'Sullivan (1999–2000) 
  Ruben Patterson (1998) 
  Ricky Pierce (1997) 
 - Kurt Rambis (Kyriakos Rambidis) (1980–1981) 
  Kendrick Ray (2019–2020) 
  Richard Rellford (1990) 
  Clint Richardson (1988–1989) 
  Brent Scott (2006–2007) 
  Marcus Slaughter (2019–2021) 
  Terence Stansbury (1997–1998) 
  Dean Tolson (1983) 
  Danny Vranes (1988–1989) 
  K'zell Wesson (2007–2008) 
  Tony White (1993–1994) 
  Jawad Williams (2016–2017) 

Europe
  Michael Andersen (1997–1999, 2008–2009) 
  Pero Antić (2001–2005) 
 -- Malcolm Armstead (2015) 
  Edin Atić (2015–2019) 
  Miloš Babić (1992–1993) 
  Andrew Betts (2000–2003) 
  Jim Bilba (2001–2002) 
 - Roderick Blakney (2002–2003) 
  Rastko Cvetković (1993–1994) 
  Roberto Chiacig (1996–1997) 
  Claudio Coldebella (1996–1998) 
  Quino Colom (2021–2022)
  Tomas Delininkaitis (2014–2015) 
 - Michael Dixon (2016–2017) 
 - Taurean Green (2009–2010, 2016) 
 - Milan Gurović (2000) 
  Dror Hajaj (2005–2006) 
  Geert Hammink (2000–2001) 
 - J. R. Holden (2001–2002) 
  Nikola Ivanović (2016–2017) 
  Arijan Komazec (2001) 
  Davor Kus (2004–2005) 
  İbrahim Kutluay (2000–2001) 
 - Darrel Lewis (2008) 
 - Matt Lojeski (2020–2021) 
  Jonas Mačiulis (2018–2021) 
 - Donnie McGrath (2009–2010, 2017) 
  Pops Mensah-Bonsu (2014–2015) 
  Milan Milošević (2014–2017) 
  Martin Müürsepp (1999–2001) 
  Sandro Nicević (2004–2005) 
 - Bane Prelević (1997–1999) 
  Slaven Rimac (2005–2006) 
 - Tyrese Rice (2020) 
  Blagota Sekulić (2003–2004) 
  Vrbica Stefanov (2000–2001) 
 - Jordan Theodore (2019) 
  Roko Ukić (2016–2017) 
 - Scottie Wilbekin (2015) 

Rest of Americas
  Braian Angola (2021–2022) 
  Carl English (2014–2015) 
  Andy Rautins (2022) 
  Xavier Rathan-Mayes (2018) 
  Ramón Rivas (1997–1998) 
  Howard Sant-Roos (2018–2020) 
  Philip Scrubb (2015) 

Oceania
  Brad Newley (2017) 

Africa
  Yanick Moreira (2020–2021)

Club captains
AEK B.C. team captains, since the 1951–52 season:

Head coaches

Chairmen history

Relationship with other clubs
AEK has links with many basketball clubs in Greece, and other countries where Greek immigrants and friends of the club live, like ΑΕΚ Stockholm B.C. in Sweden, and Greek clubs like AEK Argos B.C. and AEK Tripolis B.C.

References

Bibliography
 Μακρίδης, Παναγιώτης (1955). Η ΙΣΤΟΡΙΑ ΤΗΣ ΑΕΚ . Αθήνα, Ελλάδα: Αθλητική Ηχώ.
 Συλλογικό έργο (1979). Η αθλητική δράση των Ρωμιών της Πόλης 1896–1976 . Κωνσταντινούπολη, Τουρκία: Ειδική Έκδοση.
 Αλεξανδρής, Γ.Χ. (1996). Η Ιστορία της ΑΕΚ . Αθήνα, Ελλάδα: Ιδιωτική Έκδοση Γ.Χ. Αλεξανδρής.
 Καραπάνος, Παναγιώτης (1999). Το αλφαβητάρι της ΑΕΚ: Όλα όσα πρέπει να ξέρεις και δεν σου έχουν πει για την ΑΕΚ . Αθήνα, Ελλάδα: Εκδόσεις Δίαυλος. .
 Νόταρης, Ι. Σωτήρης (2002). ΑΕΚ, κλασικός αθλητισμός: Ο καρπός της αθλητικής παράδοσης της Πόλης στη σύγχρονη Αθήνα από το 1924 έως τις μέρες μας . Αθήνα, Ελλάδα: Εκδόσεις Καλαβρία. 
 Συλλογικό έργο (2007). Ο Κιτρινόμαυρος Δικέφαλος . Αθήνα, Ελλάδα: Εκδόσεις Παπαδόπουλος. .
 Συλλογικό έργο (2009). ΑΕΚ: Για πάντα πρωταθλητές . Αθήνα, Ελλάδα: Εκδόσεις Σκάι. .
 Κακίσης, Σωτήρης (2011). Ένωσις! . Λευκωσία, Κύπρος: Εκδόσεις Αιγαίον. .
 Συλλογικό έργο (2014). 90 ΧΡΟΝΙΑ, Η ΙΣΤΟΡΙΑ ΤΗΣ ΑΕΚ . Αθήνα, Ελλάδα: Εκδοτικός Οίκος Α. Α. Λιβάνη. .
 Αγγελίδης, Νικόλαος (2017). Όλες οι ΑΕΚ του κόσμου . Αθήνα, Ελλάδα: Εκδόσεις Νότιος Άνεμος. .

Filmography
 Tassos Boulmetis, 1968 (film), 2018.

External links 

  

 
Basketball
Basketball teams in Greece
Basketball teams established in 1924
1924 establishments in Greece
Sports clubs in Athens